La Croix primarily refers to:
 La Croix (newspaper), a French Catholic newspaper
 La Croix Sparkling Water, a beverage distributed by the National Beverage Corporation

La Croix or Lacroix may also refer to:

Places
 Lacroix-Barrez, a municipality in the Aveyron department
 Lacroix-Falgarde, a municipality in the Haute-Garonne department
 Lacroix-Saint-Ouen, a municipality in the Oise department
 Lacroix-sur-Meuse, a municipality in the Meuse department
 La Croix-aux-Bois, in the Ardennes department
 La Croix-aux-Mines, in the Vosges department 
 La Croix-Avranchin, in the Manche department
 La Croix-Blanche, in the Lot-et-Garonne department 
 La Croix-Comtesse, in the Charente-Maritime department 
 La Croix-de-la-Rochette, in the Savoie department 
 La Croix-du-Perche, in the Eure-et-Loir department
 La Croix-en-Brie, in the Seine-et-Marne department 
 La Croix-en-Champagne, in the Marne department
 La Croix-en-Touraine, in the Indre-et-Loire department 
 La Croix-Helléan, in the Morbihan department
 La Croix-Saint-Leufroy, in the Eure department 
 La Croix-sur-Gartempe, in the Haute-Vienne department
 La Croix-sur-Ourcq, in the Aisne department 
 La Croix-sur-Roudoule, in the Alpes-Maritimes department 
 La Croix-Valmer, in the Var department
 Parc de Lacroix-Laval, a park in the Metropolis of Lyon

Other uses
 Lacroix (crater), located in the southwest part of the Moon
 Lacroix (surname), including a list of people and fictional characters with the name
 Maurice Lacroix, a brand of Swiss watches

See also
 Croix (disambiguation)
 Lac à la Croix (disambiguation)